Lorne Reznowski (January 5, 1929 – November 9, 2011) was a Canadian professor of English at the University of Manitoba and leader of the Social Credit Party of Canada.

Background
He was the son of Ukrainian-Canadians Lorne William Reznowski and Anna Angela Brokowska. Reznowski received a BA degree from Loyola College in Montreal in 1949 and then worked as a longshoreman on the Pacific coast. He graduated with a Licentiate in Sacred Theology from the Catholic University of America in Washington, D.C. in 1957.

He then studied at the University of Ottawa where he earned MA and PhD degrees in English Literature.

He returned to Winnipeg  in 1966 to teach at St. Paul’s College at the University of Manitoba and taught there until his retirement in 1993.

He was active in the Social Credit Party since the age of 12 when he made radio broadcasts for the party.

A one-time national secretary of the Social Credit Party, Reznowski once worked for former Socred leader Robert N. Thompson and was a "doctrinal purist" when it came to social credit monetary theory. He was the party's candidate in Provencher for the 1968 Canadian federal election, receiving 8.2% of the popular vote.

Reznowski ran for the party leadership at its 1978 convention and was elected leader. He resigned four months after losing an October 16, 1978 by-election in Saint Boniface, Manitoba, in which he finished in fourth place with only 1,204 votes out of 43,572 valid votes (2.76%).

Reznowski cited the need for him to finish his doctoral thesis in medieval literature in order to retain his teaching position for his resignation. However, he also said that the party wanted a francophone leader and that it would have a better chance of retaining its nine seats in the House of Commons of Canada, all of which were in Quebec, with a leader from that province. It had been hoped that Reznowski's leadership would help revive the party in its former base of Western Canada.

Policies
Reznowski was described as a "doctrinal purist" who advocated the original social credit monetary theory of C.H. Douglas. He promised that a Social Credit government would cut retail sales tax by 25 per cent and argued for moral responsibility in society with the family as its basic union. He also expressed his opposition to homosexuality, abortion, birth control and working mothers and his support for capital punishment. Reznowki also argued that Prime Minister Pierre Trudeau was soft on communism and that there was an imminent threat of a takeover of Canada by the Soviet Union. As national party leader Reznowski criticized Bill Bennett, leader of the British Columbia Social Credit Party and Premier of British Columbia for rejecting social credit doctrine quipping that Ogopogo would be a better name for Bennett's party.

Electoral history

References

Social Credit Party of Canada leaders
Academic staff of the University of Manitoba
1929 births
2011 deaths
Canadian anti-communists
Canadian anti-abortion activists
Canadian people of Ukrainian descent
Politicians from Winnipeg